Shari Bossuyt (born 5 September 2000) is a Belgian professional racing cyclist, who currently rides for UCI Women's Continental Team . She rode in the women's team pursuit event at the 2019 UEC European Track Championships in Apeldoorn, Netherlands.

Major results Road
2022
 2nd Overall Belgium Tour
1st  Youth classification
 8th Dwars door Vlaanderen
 9th Le Samyn
 10th Overall Bloeizone Fryslân Tour
1st  Young rider classification
 10th Nokere Koerse voor Dames

Track
2021
 UEC European Championships
2nd  Points race

2022
 UCI World Championships
1st  Madison (with Lotte Kopecky)

2023
 UEC European Championships
2nd  Points race

References

External links
 

2000 births
Living people
Belgian female cyclists
Place of birth missing (living people)
Sportspeople from Kortrijk
Cyclists from West Flanders
UCI Track Cycling World Champions (women)
21st-century Belgian women